The Sri Dasmesh Pipe Band (Punjabi: ਸ੍ਰੀ ਦਸਮੇਸ਼ ਪਾਈਪ ਬੈਂਡ) is a Malaysian Sikh pipe band.

History 
The band was formed in 1986 by Sukdev Singh, a commercial pilot and his brother, Harvinder Singh and was named after the 10th Guru of the Sikhs.

Sri Dasmesh Pipe Band's work 
They have played in various countries including in Australia to mark the centenary celebrations of world war 1 in 2009 and 2015  and also in Scotland in 2015 to pay tribute to Maharaja Duleep Singh - the last Maharaja of the Sikhs.

In 2015 the band made history by becoming the first band from South East Asia to compete in World Pipe Band Championship. In 2016 they won the Kuala Lumpur Highland Games. In 2019 they made history again by becoming the first group from South East Asia to win the World Pipe Band Championship. They received a hero’s welcome upon their return to Malaysia.

References 

Pipe bands